Back on Top may refer to:

 Back on Top (Van Morrison album), 1999
 "Back on Top" (song)
 Back on Top (O'Jays album), 1968
 Back on Top (Pinetop Perkins album), 2000
 Back on Top (The Front Bottoms album), 2015